Miguel Sánchez Rincón (born 10 August 1988) is a Mexican footballer.

On 19 April 2009 he played in his first Primera Division de Mexico match for Jaguares against Toluca.

References

External links
 
 Miguel Sanchez Rincon at LA Wolves

Association football defenders
Liga MX players
Chiapas F.C. footballers
Sportspeople from Morelia
1988 births
Living people
Footballers from Michoacán
Mexican footballers
Mexican expatriate footballers
Mexican expatriate sportspeople in the United States
Expatriate soccer players in the United States
Ontario Fury players
Anaheim Bolts
Professional Arena Soccer League players
Major Arena Soccer League players
United Premier Soccer League players
National Independent Soccer Association players